Robert McFarlane (born 7 February 1955) is an Australian cricketer. He played two first-class matches for Western Australia in 1981/82.

References

External links
 

1955 births
Living people
Australian cricketers
Western Australia cricketers
Cricketers from Perth, Western Australia